The Albert S. Piper Homestead Claim Shanty is a structure located near the unincorporated community of Carpenter, in Beadle County, South Dakota. Built in 1882, it was listed on the National Register of Historic Places in 1998.

It is a woodframe  claim shanty built with horizontal wood plank walls.

References

National Register of Historic Places in Beadle County, South Dakota
Buildings and structures completed in 1882